Gomphus can refer to either one of two genera of living organism:
 Gomphus (dragonfly), a widespread genus of dragonfly
 Gomphus (fungus), a small genus of fungus